The Mugher Mudstone is a geologic formation located in Ethiopia. It dates to the Tithonian stage of the Late Jurassic. The lithology consists of gypsum, dolomite and shale alternations at the base, overlain by mudstone intercalated with fine to medium grained sandstone.

Indeterminate dromaeosaurid teeth are known from the formation. Many other remains have been uncovered also, including indeterminate ornithopods and allosauroids. The tooth of a macronarian sauropod is known from the formation

See also 

 List of dinosaur-bearing rock formations
 List of stratigraphic units with indeterminate dinosaur fossils
 List of fossiliferous stratigraphic units in Ethiopia
 Geology of Ethiopia

References

Bibliography 
 Weishampel, David B.; Dodson, Peter; and Osmólska, Halszka (eds.): The Dinosauria, 2nd, Berkeley: University of California Press. 861 pp. .

Geologic formations of Ethiopia
Jurassic System of Africa
Late Jurassic Africa
Tithonian Stage
Mudstone formations
Ethiopian Highlands